Operation Drake (1978–1980) was a round-the-world voyage with the participation of young people from many countries, sailing in the brigantine Eye of the Wind. She left Plymouth in October 1978 and returned to London two years later, in December 1980.

Named after Sir Francis Drake, who had circumnavigated the world four hundred years before on the Golden Hind, Operation Drake was divided into nine ocean- and one land-based phases, each lasting about 3 months. On each phase, a number of Young Explorers aged between seventeen and twenty-four, selected from countries all over the world, worked together on serious scientific exploration, research and community projects.

The expedition was mounted by the Scientific Exploration Society, and the expedition leader was Colonel John Blashford-Snell. Charles, Prince of Wales was the Patron of Operation Drake.

Amongst the works produced on the voyage were series of specimens, including bats obtained in New Guinea, that were deposited and examined at the British Museum of Natural History.

Books
 
"In the Eye of the Wind", by Roger Chapman (Hamish Hamilton, London 1982)
 )

See also
Raleigh International

Further reading

References

External links
Eye of the Wind - Present owners
Eye of the Wind -  1973-2001
Pictures of "Eye of the Wind"
Operation Drake Pictures - April to December 1980 (Borkur Arnvidarson)

1978 in the United Kingdom
1980 in the United Kingdom
Sail training
Replications of ancient voyages
Circumnavigations
Scientific expeditions